Nicholas Jonathan Read (born 1964) is a British businessman. He is the former CEO of Vodafone Group, holding the position between October 2018 and December 2022.

Education
He earned a degree in accounting and finance from Manchester Metropolitan University in 1986. He is a Fellow Certified Management Accountant.

Career
Read worked for Federal Express Corporation, with roles located in the UK, Belgium and the United States. He also worked at United Business Media Plc, performing divisional CFO roles in both companies.

While Read was serving as CFO for Vizzavi in 2001, Vodafone bought out its joint venture partner, Vivendi Universal and subsequently merged Vizzavi's operations with Vodafone. Read became the CFO for Vodafone's UK business in 2002 and then CCO in 2003. On the 1st of May 2006, he became CEO of Vodafone UK.

In 2008, Read became the Group's Chief Executive for the Africa, Middle East and Asia region. As part of the role he became a board member of numerous Vodafone subsidiaries, joint ventures and minority positions. They included China Mobile, Vodacom Group, Safaricom plc, Vodafone Egypt, Vodafone Qatar, Indus Towers, Vodafone India, Vodafone Hutchinson Australia, and VodafoneZiggo.

In 2014, Read became the CFO of Vodafone Group plc and joined the company's main board. He was appointed Group CEO four years later in October 2018. In his role as CEO, he became a United Nations Broadband Commissioner and HeForShe alliance champion. Read also joined the board of Booking Holdings Inc as a non-exec director in 2018 & member of the Audit Committee. In 2022, Read was the recipient of an Honorary Doctor of Business Administration degree from Manchester Metropolitan University. In December 2022, it was announced that Read would be stepping down as Group CEO of Vodafone. He remained as an advisor to Vodafone's board until 31st March 2023.

References

Living people
1964 births
Alumni of Manchester Metropolitan University
British technology chief executives
British telecommunications industry businesspeople
English accountants
English chief executives
Vodafone people